Hans-Jörg Jenewein (born 12 June 1974) is an Austrian politician who is currently a Member of the Federal Council for the Freedom Party of Austria (FPÖ).

References

1974 births
Living people
Members of the Federal Council (Austria)
Members of the National Council (Austria)
Freedom Party of Austria politicians